Events in the year 1987 in Brazil:

Incumbents

Federal government
 President: José Sarney
 Vice President: vacant

Governors 
 Acre: Iolanda Fleming (until 15 March); Flaviano Melo (from 15 March)
 Alagoas: José de Medeiros Tavares (until 15 March); Fernando Collor de Mello (from 15 March)
 Amazonas: Gilberto Mestrinho (until 15 March); Amazonino Mendes (from 15 March)
 Bahia: João Durval Carneiro then Waldir Pires 
 Ceará: Gonzaga Mota (until 15 March); Tasso Jereissati (from 15 March)
 Espírito Santo: José Moraes (until 15 March); Max Freitas Mauro (from 15 March)
 Goiás: Onofre Quinan (until 15 March); Henrique Santillo (from 15 March)
 Maranhão: Luís Rocha (until 15 March); Epitácio Cafeteira (from 15 March)
 Mato Grosso: Wilmar Peres de Faria then Carlos Bezerra
 Mato Grosso do Sul: Ramez Tebet (until 15 March); Marcelo Miranda Soares (from 15 March)
 Minas Gerais: Hélio Garcia (until 15 March); Newton Cardoso (from 15 March)
 Pará: Jader Barbalho (until 15 March); Hélio Gueiros (from 15 March)
 Paraíba: Milton Bezerra Cabral (until 15 March); Tarcísio Burity (from 15 March)
 Paraná: João Elísio Ferraz de Campos then Alvaro Dias 
 Pernambuco: Gustavo Krause (until 15 March); Miguel Arraes (from 15 March)
 Piauí: Bona Medeiros (until 15 March); Alberto Silva (from 15 March)
 Rio de Janeiro: Leonel Brizola then Moreira Franco
 Rio Grande do Norte: Radir Pereira de Araujo (until 15 March); Geraldo José Ferreira de Melo (from 15 March)
 Rio Grande do Sul: Jair de Oliveira Soares (until 15 March); Pedro Simon (from 15 March)
 Rondônia: Ângelo Angelin (until 15 March); Jerônimo Garcia de Santana (from 15 March)
 Santa Catarina: Esperidião Amin (until 15 March); Pedro Ivo Campos (from 15 March)
 São Paulo: André Franco Montoro (until 15 March); Orestes Quércia (from 15 March)
 Sergipe: João Alves Filho (until 15 March); Antônio Carlos Valadares (from 15 March)

Vice governors
 Acre: Edison Simão Cadaxo (from 15 March)
 Alagoas: Moacir Andrade (from 15 March)
 Amazonas: Vivaldo Barros Frota (from 15 March)
 Bahia: Edvaldo de Oliveira Flores (until 15 March); Nilo Moraes Coelho (from 15 March)
 Ceará: José Adauto Bezerra (until 15 March); Francisco Castelo de Castro (from 15 March)
 Espírito Santo: José Moraes (until 15 March); Carlos Alberto Batista da Cunha (from 15 March)
 Goiás: Joaquim Domingos Roriz (from 15 March)
 Maranhão: João Rodolfo Ribeiro Gonçalves (until 15 March); João Alberto Souza (from 15 March)
 Mato Grosso: Edison Freitas de Oliveira (from 15 March)
 Mato Grosso do Sul: vacant (until 15 March); George Takimoto (from 15 March)
 Minas Gerais: Júnia Marise de Azeredo Coutinho (from 15 March)
 Pará: Laércio Dias Franco (until 15 March); Hermínio Calvinho Filho (from 15 March)
 Paraíba: Antônio da Costa Gomes (until 15 March); vacant (from 15 March)
 Paraná: Ary Veloso Queiroz (from 15 March)
 Pernambuco: Carlos Wilson Rocha de Queirós Campos (from 15 March)
 Piauí: Lucídio Portela Nunes (from 15 March)
 Rio de Janeiro: Darcy Ribeiro (until 15 March); Francisco Amaral (from 15 March)
 Rio Grande do Norte: vacant (until 15 March); Garibaldi Alves (from 15 March)
 Rio Grande do Sul: Cláudio Ênio Strassburger (until 15 March); Sinval Sebastião Duarte Guazzelli (from 15 March)
 Rondônia: Orestes Muniz Filho (from 15 March)
 Santa Catarina: Victor Fontana (until 15 March); Casildo João Maldaner (from 15 March)
 São Paulo: vacant (until 15 March); Almino Afonso (from 15 March)  
 Sergipe: Antônio Carlos Valadares (until 15 March); Benedito de Figueiredo (from 15 March)

Events

Births
January 10 – César Cielo, swimmer
January 15 – Jesus Luz, model and DJ
June 25 – Hugo Bonemer, actor

Deaths

See also 
1987 in Brazilian football
1987 in Brazilian television

References 

 
1980s in Brazil
Years of the 20th century in Brazil
Brazil
Brazil